In 1954, Billboard magazine published two charts specifically covering the top-performing songs in the United States in rhythm and blues and related African-American-oriented music genres: Best Sellers in Stores (published as National Best Sellers through the issue dated February 13) and Most Played in Juke Boxes.  The two charts are considered part of the lineage of the magazine's multimetric R&B chart launched in 1958, which since 2005 has been published under the title Hot R&B/Hip Hop Songs.

In the issue of Billboard dated January 2, blues singer Big Joe Turner was at number one on the juke box chart with "Honey Hush" and Clyde McPhatter and the Drifters were atop the best sellers listing with "Money Honey".  Both acts returned to the top spot later in the year.  In June, Turner topped the juke box chart with "Shake, Rattle and Roll".  McPhatter and the Drifters reached number one on both listings in July with "Honey Love".  Shortly after Turner topped the chart with "Shake, Rattle and Roll", Bill Haley and his Comets released a cover version which is considered one of the most influential recordings in the development of the emerging rock and roll genre.  Although Turner would not reach number one again, he would enjoy a lengthy career and be inducted into the Rock and Roll Hall of Fame in 1987.  His original recording of "Shake, Rattle and Roll" was ranked number 127 on Rolling Stones 2003 list of the 500 Greatest Songs of All Time.

The year's longest-running number one on the juke box chart was "The Things That I Used to Do" by Guitar Slim, which spent 14 consecutive weeks in the top spot.  It was the only chart entry the Mississippi-born guitarist achieved in his career, but is considered to have significantly influenced the development of both soul music and the use of the electric guitar in rock music.  The Rock and Roll Hall of Fame included the track on its list of 500 Songs That Shaped Rock and Roll.   On the best sellers chart, "Honey Love" by the Drifters and Clyde McPhatter tied for the longest time spent atop the chart with Roy Hamilton's version of "You'll Never Walk Alone" from the 1945 musical Carousel, both songs spending eight weeks at number one.  While no act achieved more than one number one on the juke box chart, three acts joined the Drifters in gaining two chart-toppers on the best sellers listing: Faye Adams, Ruth Brown (who replaced herself at number one in the issue of Billboard dated November 20), and the Midnighters.  The year's final number one on the juke box listing was "You Upset Me Baby" by B.B. King and the last chart-topper of 1954 on the best sellers listing was "Hearts of Stone" by the Charms.

Chart history

References

Works cited

1954
1954 record charts
1954 in American music